The 2011 European Show Jumping Championship was held between September 13 and September 18, 2011 in Madrid in Spain.

It was the 31st edition of the European Show Jumping Championships, only in the 19th time team medals were awarded.

Organization

Before the event 
In April 2009 the FEI chose the Spanish capital Madrid to host the 2011 European Show Jumping Championship. Madrid was in the last years alternately with Gijón location of the annual Spanish Nations Cup horse show in Show Jumping.

It was the second time in European Show Jumping Championship history – after 1993 in Gijón – that Spain held this sports event.

Event and location 
The European Show Jumping Championship was opened in afternoon on Tuesday, September 13. The sport at the Championship had started on Wednesday. Parallel to the European Championships, a CSI 3*-Show jumping horse show is held. The Event will end on Sunday after the prize giving ceremony.

The event is held at the Club de Campo Villa de Madrid.

Competitions

General 
The team competition and the individual competition is held from Wednesday to Friday at the same competitions. The individual competition will end after a final competition on Sunday.

Timetable 
The first competition was a speed and handiness competition. Here the jumping faults are converted to seconds and added to the time in seconds. After this competition the calculated seconds are converted into point for the European Championship individual ranking.

The second competition was a show jumping competition with two rounds. It is held on Thursday and Friday. On Friday only the best ten nations and the best 50 riders are allowed to start in the second round (all team riders of the ten teams are allowed to start). The results of three riders per team counts for the team result. After the Friday competition the team medals will be awarded. The best 25 riders start on Sunday in one more show jumping competition with two rounds. After this competition the individual medals are awarded.

Results

Provisional result after first day 
After the first day of the competitions the French team was in the lead. The teams of German, Sweden, the Netherlands, Great Britain and Belgium follow with a distance of less than eight points.

In the individual ranking with Olivier Guillon also a French rider was in the lead. 27 riders follow with a distance of less than four points.

Individual ranking:

Team ranking:

Provisional result after second day 
The show jumping course was very difficult, much riders had more than one fault. Winning team of the day was the Netherlands. With three round with no faults the team is now in the lead. The French team lost his lead because of faults, distributed to all team riders.

In individual ranking the second placed rider from the first day, Stefan Eder, had 16 penalty points – now he is 37th. Also the former leader, Olivier Guillon, had a jumping fault (now 9th). In the lead is now German team rider Carsten-Otto Nagel.

Individual ranking:

Team ranking:

Provisional result after third day 
At the third day, the riders had to ride the same show jumping course as Thursday. The winning team of Thursday, the Netherlands, had some faults. Germany and France benefit this, both teams had three rounds with zero faults at this day.

The German team had won the team gold medal already after the third rider (with in total four point on Thursday). The last rider of the team, Ludger Beerbaum, could improve the result with a round without faults. France had won the silver medal, Great Britain team won bronze. The teams of the Netherlands, Sweden and Switzerland were in the places four to six, in qualification for the 2012 Summer Olympics.

In the not final individual ranking the German Carsten-Otto Nagel with Corradina are again in the lead. Billy Twomey (Thursday second placed) and Gregory Wathelet (Thursday fourth placed) had both 16 penalty points.

Individual ranking:

Final results

Team result

Individual result 

At the last day of the event the riders had to ride a show jumping competition with two different rounds. Only 22 of 25 qualified rider start in this competition.

In round one of this competition first placed Carsten-Otto Nagel and second placed Nick Skelton had both one jumping fault. So the Dutch rider Gerco Schröder, who had no faults in this round, was in the lead. Three riders of the 22 did not start in round two because they had no chance more to get a real good position in the final ranking.

Also the second round brought further changes in the individual ranking. After the rides of Nagel and Skelton (bouth had again four penalty points) the Swedish rider Rolf-Göran Bengtsson was in the lead. The last rider, Gerco Schröder, had a lead of more than five point before round two – but he had one fault in the mid of the course and again one fault on the last fence. So he lost his gold medal (like two days before in the team competition) and finished fourth. so the new European Champion was Rolf-Göran Bengtsson with the 16-year-old gelding Ninja.

The only riders who were clear in both rounds was Jeroen Dubbeldam with Simon und Henrik von Eckermann with Coupe de Coeur.

More informations 
The collection and data communication of the result was performed, as already at the 2010 FEI World Equestrian Games, by Dutch company Sport Computer Graphics (SCG).

The main competition of the CSI 3*-horse show is the traditional Kings Cup (Gran Premio – Copa S.M. El Rey). It was held on Saturday (September 17, 2011) at 4:45 pm. It was a show jumping competition with one round and one jump-off.

References

External links 
 web page of the 2011 European Show Jumping Championship
 timetable and results

Show Jumping
Equestrian sports competitions in Spain
Sports competitions in Madrid
2011 in Spanish sport
International sports competitions hosted by Spain
2011 in Madrid